Besiege is a strategy sandbox video game developed and published by Spiderling Studios. The game was released for Windows, macOS and Linux in February 2020, which followed a five-year long early access phase. A console version for Xbox One and Xbox Series X/S was released in February 2022.

Overview 
The game allows players to build outlandish medieval siege engines to pit against castles or armies. Players select from a collection of mechanical parts that can be connected together to build a machine. Each level has a goal, such as "destroy the windmill" or "kill 100 soldiers". Although the goals are relatively simple, the wide variety of possible approaches allows for experimentation.

Despite the medieval theme to the game, players are able to build intricate working models of four-stroke and two-stroke engines and vehicle systems, including computer systems, as well as modern vehicles such as tanks, automobiles, bomber planes, propeller planes, helicopters, airships, and battleships. An update in December 2017 added a level editor and multiplayer capabilities, such as pitting the vehicle creations against each other, or other players attempting to knock down a castle created by another. Later they added advanced build mode which grants the player the possibility to build complicated machines. With these additions, players developed systems to run tournaments similar to the television show BattleBots, pitting their Besiege creations in one-on-one matches with others to try to take the other out.

The game was first released for Linux, OS X and Windows via early access on 28 January 2015 before officially releasing on 18 February 2020. A console version is set to be released for Xbox One and Xbox Series X/S on 10 February 2022. It features reworked user interface, photo mode, and a different Workshop for sharing user creations. However, it does not have the multiplayer or level editor functionality of the PC version.

Reception 
Marsh Davies of Rock, Paper, Shotgun praised an early version of the game, comparing its "bouncily caricatured" science to a 12th-century version of Kerbal Space Program. Davies also praised the game's stylized graphics and sound.

Another Rock Paper Shotgun article by Jay Castello which is a released-version review published on March 2, 2020. Jay Castello admired the game varieties that kept her engaging and trying to construct the new better siege engines. Although there was some lack of guidance that was mentioned in the article, the game has had a strong community support with mods, guides, tricks created by people who have a very good handle on besiege construction tools since the game was released early-access in 2015.

On the date September 22, 2022, Besiege has Overwhelmingly Positive all reviews on steam with 95% positive reviews from 39,871 reviews, and Very Positive recent reviews with 93% positive reviews from 171 reviews.

Worth a Buy (Game review YouTuber) published his Besiege (early access) video review on January 23, 2015, after he had played the game for 1 hour. He mentioned that the game caught his eye with its look and cheap price of $6. The game building mechanic is fun with lots of crazy weapons to equip and experiment with. Worth a Buy summarizes that this game is fun, cheap, and really worth a buy.

PC Gamer article by Rick Lane gave the game 85 out of 100 and said: "Besiege lets you build siege weapons in a medieval fantasy realm. It contains four kingdoms, with each kingdom having many levels in it. The level is nicely crafted, with objectives for you to do in order to pass the level. Each level is designed to make you come up with a new mechanic with different tasks for you to do. You will be given a building area at the start of the level. Besiege provides a toolkit that's easier to understand compared to Kerbal Space Program, but lacks a good tutorial to guide the beginners. The toolkit contains a lot of objects for you to use and work with. You can build from cranes to flying machines with it. Besiege allows you to adjust individual object parameters such as power, speed and even binding it to do certain actions."

References

External links
 

2020 video games
Early access video games
Indie video games
Linux games
MacOS games
Multiplayer and single-player video games
Simulation video games
Video games with Steam Workshop support
Strategy video games
Video games developed in the United Kingdom
Windows games
Xbox One games
Xbox Series X and Series S games